Ali Imran is a fictional character in various detective novels written by Ibn-e-Safi.

Ali Imran may also refer to:

Ali Imran (cricketer, born 1985), Quetta cricket team player
Ali Imran (cricketer, born 1998), Islamabad cricket team player

See also
Ali Imran Ramz (born 1979), Bengali politician
Al Imran, third chapter of the Quran
Imran Ali (disambiguation)